In the 2020–21 season, Stal Mielec competed in the Ekstraklasa. Moreover, they participated in the season's Polish Cup edition, since they were eliminated by Piast Gliwice, following a 1–1 draw (3–4 on penalties) in the round of 32.

Players

Pre-season

° symbol applies for players who joined the club in the pre-season term.

Competitions

Ekstraklasa

Standings

Results summary

Matches

Polish Cup

References

Stal Mielec
Stal Mielec